The 1949 LSU Tigers football team was an American football team that represented  Louisiana State University (LSU) as a member of the Southeastern Conference (SEC) during the 1949 college football season. In their second year under head coach Gaynell Tinsley, the team compiled an overall record of 8–3, with a mark of 4–2 in conference play, placing fifth in the SEC, and with a loss against Oklahoma in the Sugar Bowl.

Schedule

References

LSU
LSU Tigers football seasons
LSU Tigers football